Kashafrud or Kashafrud River is a river that flows from the Hezar Masjed Mountains in Razavi Khorasan Province in northeast of Iran. After passing from the vicinity of the cities of Radkan and Chenaran in Razavi Khorasan Province and then passing north and east of the city of Mashhad, the Kashfrud  joins the Harirud River at the frontier of Iran and Turkmenistan.

Geography
The Kashaf Rood River is 240km. in length and originates from mountain ranges of Hezar Masjed and Binalood.

The main town on the river is the city of Mashhad. The town of Tus is also on the river.

The river is irrigated, and known since  the Middle Ages for its fertility.

History
Alexander the Great passed through the valley of the Kashaf River.
The Arabs entered the valley in 650AD.
Sultan Abu Said built a dam on the river.
The Geographer Al-Tusi was from the Kashafrud valley. The army of Genghis Khan attacked the region of the Kashafrud in 1220AD.

Kashafrud Basin 
Kashafrud Basin is an archaeological site in Iran, known for the Lower Palaeolithic artifacts collected there; these are the oldest-known evidence for human occupation of Iran. On the basis of their geological contexts, this collection is more than 800,000 years old. Thus, Kashfarud is one of the oldest human settlements in Iran. A number of stone tools discovered by Kashafrud are displayed in the Paleolithic Hall of the National Museum of Iran.

References

Landforms of Razavi Khorasan Province
Rivers of Iran